Gould Pond is a small lake located north-northeast of Long Eddy in Delaware County, New York. Hoolihan Brook flows through Gould Pond.

See also
 List of lakes in New York

References 

Lakes of New York (state)
Lakes of Delaware County, New York